Thomas Russell (1836 – 15 August 1911) was a Scottish businessman and politician. He was a partner in the Saracen Foundry, established by his brother-in-law Walter Macfarlane, and bought the Ascog House estate in Bute. He also built a Glasgow city house at 5 Cleveden Road, completed in 1887, and developed housing in Ascog.

He was also Liberal MP for Glasgow for a few months in 1885. He was returned unopposed at a by-election.

The seat was abolished at the next general election.

Notes

External links 
 

1836 births
1911 deaths
Members of the Parliament of the United Kingdom for Scottish constituencies
Members of the Parliament of the United Kingdom for Glasgow constituencies
Scottish Liberal Party MPs
UK MPs 1880–1885
19th-century Scottish businesspeople